Aleksander Sõster (28 December 1890 Palmse – about November 1941 Mordovia) was an Estonian soldier and politician. He was a member of IV Riigikogu.

References

1890 births
1941 deaths
Members of the Riigikogu, 1929–1932
Members of the Riigikogu, 1932–1934
Estonian military personnel of the Estonian War of Independence
People from Haljala Parish
People who died in the Gulag
Estonian people who died in Soviet detention